The IWRG Intercontinental Welterweight Championship (Campeonato Intercontinental Welter IWRG in Spanish) is a professional wrestling championship promoted by the Mexican wrestling promotion International Wrestling Revolution Group (IWRG) since 1998. Because Lucha Libre puts more emphasis on the lower weight classes, this division is considered more important than the normally more prestigious heavyweight division of the promotion. 

The first Welterweight champion was Dr. Cerebro, winning the title on March 1, 1998, in a tournament final against Shiima Nobunaga.
Tonalli is the current champion, having defeated Jessy Ventura for the title on December 25, 2022. Tonalli is the 39th overall champion and the 21st person to have held the championship. Cerebro Negro is the person with most title reigns, a total of seven. He also has the distinction of having the shortest reign (at seven days) and the longest reign (1,246 days).

As it is a professional wrestling championship, the championship was not won not by actual competition, but by a scripted ending to a match determined by the bookers and match makers. On occasion the promotion declares a championship vacant, which means there is no champion at that point in time. This can either be due to a storyline, or real life issues such as a champion suffering an injury being unable to defend the championship, or leaving the company.

Title history

Combined reigns

Footnotes

References

External links
 IWRG Intercontinental Welterweight Championship

International Wrestling Revolution Group championships
Welterweight wrestling championships
Intercontinental professional wrestling championships